Moss Grew on the Swords and Plowshares Alike is the tenth studio album by American avant-garde metal band Kayo Dot. It was released on October 29, 2021 via Prophecy Productions. It reached number 100 in the German Top 100 album charts for the first time during the week after its release, November 5, 2021.  It is the first album since 2006's Dowsing Anemone With Copper Tongue to feature founding member Greg Massi.

Critical reception 

The album was released to critical acclaim, with many celebrating the band's foray into a more doom metal-influenced sound. Metal Injection gave Moss an 8.5/10, describing it as "surreally gothic" and claiming that it "epitomizes why Kayo Dot remains a laudable one-of-a-kind project". Everything is Noise praised the album, dubbing it both "one of the best Kayo Dot records" and "a thoroughly amazing album" wherein "the reward is proportional with your investment".

Track listing

Personnel
 Toby Driver – vocals, bass, guitar, synthesizers, percussion, etc.
 Greg Massi – guitar
 Jason Byron – all lyrics

References

2021 albums
Kayo Dot albums